The 2020–21 Iraqi Premier League was the 47th season of the Iraqi Premier League since its establishment in 1974. The season started on 25 October 2020 and ended on 28 July 2021, with the relegation play-off held on 30 July 2021.

Al-Quwa Al-Jawiya sealed their seventh Premier League title with three matches to spare, finishing ahead of Al-Zawraa and Al-Najaf. Al-Quwa Al-Jawiya also won the Iraq FA Cup to become the first Iraqi club since the 2001–02 season to win the double. Their manager Ayoub Odisho became the most successful coach in Premier League history with four titles.

New rules
For the first time in the Iraqi Premier League, the Iraq Football Association decided to use head-to-head points as the first tiebreaker for teams level on points, followed by head-to-head goal difference, total goal difference, total number of wins and total goals scored. Also, the maximum number of substitutions in a game for each team was increased from four to five.

Teams

Twenty teams competed in the league – the top eighteen teams from the 2018–19 season and the two promoted teams from the 2018–19 Iraq Division One.

Clubs and locations

Notes

League table

Results

Relegation play-off

Samarra are promoted to the Iraqi Premier League, while Al-Sinaat Al-Kahrabaiya are relegated to the Iraq Division One.

Season statistics

Top scorers

Hat-tricks 

Notes
(H) – Home team

Awards

Number of teams by region

Match ball
On 23 October 2020, Umbro announced their official partnership with Iraq Football Association to manufacture the official match ball for the Iraqi Premier League. The official match ball is named Neo Toba. The design was conceived in such a way as to reflect the colours of the Iraqi flag and the patterns represent symbols of ancient Mesopotamian civilization. The term Toba is taken from the Iraqi dialect which means "ball" in common parlance.

See also
 2020–21 Iraq FA Cup

References

External links 
Official website 
Iraq Football Association

Iraqi Premier League seasons
1
Iraq